Alessandro Melis (Cagliari, 7/6/1969) is an Italian architect and the curator of the Italian National Pavilion at the 17th Venice Biennale. He is also a professor of architecture and the inaugural endowed chair of the New York Institute of Technology.

Career 
Appointed  by the Italian Government in 2019, he follows the previous curators Mario Cucinella (2018) and Tamassociati (2016), as curator of the Italian Pavilion.

Alessandro Melis is the IDC Foundation Endowed Chair of the New York Institute of Technology. Previously he was director of the International Cluster for Sustainable Cities at the University of Portsmouth, and the head of Postgraduate engagement at the school of Architecture and Planning of the University of Auckland. He has also been invited as a keynote speaker at the China Academy of Art, the MoMA New York, the University of Cambridge, TEDx, the Italian Institute of Culture in London, the NZ Cycling Conference, the Foster Foundation (as an academic staff member), and the UNESCO Headquarters in Paris.

In 2020 he is appointed Ambassador of Italian Design in Paris, by Adi (Associazione Disegno Industriale) and the Italian Mnistery of Foreign Affairs.

In 1996, he founded Heliopolis 21, a multi-awarded architecture practice based in Italy, Germany, and the UK. The SR1938 Institute of the University of Pisa, the Stella Maris Hospital  and the Auditorium of Sant’Anna, inaugurated by the president of the Italian Republic, Sergio Mattarella, are acknowledged both in scholar publications and in popular magazines as examples of excellence in sustainable design. The recognition of Alessandro’s research is corroborated by a record of over 150 peer review journal and book publications (including practice based research outputs) such as the seminal monograph on Alessandro Gherardesca, pivotal researches on the Algerian El Houma, in collaboration with Yazid Khemri, Temporary Appropriation, with Antonio Lara Hernandez, and by as many citations.

Alessandro Melis is acknowledged, together with Telmo Pievani, for introducing the concept of Exaptation in Architecture.

His work was the object of several exhibitions and of a recent monograph (Rome, 2020) authored by several scholars of the universities of Palermo and Bari and edited by Francesco Fallacara Chirico, titled “Alessandro Melis, Utopic Real World.

In 2017 Alessandro Melis and Steffen Lehmann created the interdisciplinary project CRUNCH: Climate Resilient Urban Nexus Choices: Operationalising the Food-Water-Energy Nexus. This is a research project funded by Horizon 2020, Belmont Forum Belmont Forum, ESRC and other funding bodies. Alessandro Melis is leading the project on behalf of the University of Portsmouth, where he is professor of architecture innovation.

Awards 
He has been nominated as an ambassador of Italian Design 2020 by ADI and the Italian Ministry of Foreign Affairs.

Publications 

 Melis, A. (2021). Periferia e pregiudizio. Bordeaux Edizioni. https://www.bordeauxedizioni.it/prodotto/periferia-e-pregiudizio/
Melis, A., Lara Hernandez, J. A., & Thompson, J. R. (Eds.) (2020). Temporary Appropriation of Cities: Human Spatialisation in Public Spaces and Community Resilience. (1 ed.) Springer International Publishing.
 Melis, A. (Ed.) (2020). ZombieCity: Strategie urbane di sopravvivenza agli zombie e alla crisi climatica . D Editore.
 Lara Hernandez, J. A., Coulter, C. M., & Melis, A. (2020). Temporary appropriation and urban informality: exploring the subtle distinction. Cities, 99, [102626].
 Di Raimo, A., Lehmann, S., & Melis, A. (Eds.) (2020). Informality through Sustainability: Urban Informality Now. (Earthscan Series on Sustainable Design). Routledge. https://www.routledge.com/Informality-through-Sustainability-Urban-Informality-Now/Raimo-Lehmann-Melis/p/book/9780367354770
 Melis, A., & Pievani, T. (In press). Exaptation as a design strategy for resilient communities. In Integrated Science: Transdisciplinarity Across the Different Disciplines Springer Nature. https://www.springer.com/gp/book/9783030652722
 Melis, A. (2019). Leonardo da Vinci designed an ideal city that was centuries ahead of its time. The Conversation. https://theconversation.com/leonardo-da-vinci-designed-an-ideal-city-that-was-centuries-ahead-of-its-time-111884
 Melis, A. (2019). The introduction of nature in the Austrian radicals practice. In F. Lemes De Oliveira, & I. Mell (Eds.), Planning Cities with Nature: Theories, Strategies and Methods (pp. 45–63). (Cities and Nature). Springer. https://doi.org/10.1007/978-3-030-01866-5_4
 Melis, A. (2019). Stadiums aren't fated to disrepair and disuse. History shows they can change with the city. The Conversation. https://theconversation.com/stadiums-arent-fated-to-disrepair-and-disuse-history-shows-they-can-change-with-the-city-109076
 Melis, A., & Stumbles, L. J., (2018). How to build cities and destroy motorways: a radical perspective on environmental design. D Editore. http://deditore.com/prodotto/how-to-build-the-cities-and-destroy-motorways/
 Melis, A., & Gatley, J. (2018). A romantic in Tuscany: Alessandro Gherardesca and the transformation of Pisa’s Piazza del Duomo. Cogent Social Sciences, 2018(4), [1487256]. https://doi.org/10.1080/23311886.2018.1487256
 Melis, A., Auer, T., & Aimar, F. (Eds.) (2017). Disruptive technologies: the integration of advanced technology in architecture teaching and radical projects for the future city. Wolters Kluwer Italia. http://www.wolterskluwer.it/
 Melis, A., Davis, M., & Balaara, A. (2017). The history and invocation of the Arche in Austrian Radical architecture thinking. Cogent Social Sciences, 3(1), [1368366]. https://doi.org/10.1080/23311886.2017.1368366
 Melis, A., & Ijatuyi, O. (2015). Regeneration of the historical villages of Tuscany, through conservation and tourism development strategies. In Y. Xiujing (Ed.), 中国美术学院建筑遗产保护国际论坛论文集: Proceedings of the Architecture Forum of the China Academy of Arts (pp. 35–40). China Academy of Arts Publishing House. http://www.caajiuye.com/company-157924.html
 Melis, A., & Gasperini, M. (2014). Shining Dark Territories: 100 thoughts of architecture. Edizioni ETS.
 Melis, A. (2013). Good morning Babylon: the cathedral is a movie. Framework, 54(1), 82-84. https://muse.jhu.edu/article/496080
 Melis, A. (2009). L'Architettura Delle Chiese. In S. Sodi (Ed.), Giovanni Michelucci e la Chiesa italiana (pp. 65–84). Edizioni San Paolo.
 Melis, A., & Melis, G. L. (2002). Architettura romantica. In G. Morolli (Ed.), Alessandro Gherardesca, architetto toscano del Romanticismo (Pisa, 1777-1852)
 Melis, A., & Melis, G. L. (2002). I teorici dell'architettura illuminata. In G. Morolli (Ed.), Alessandro Gherardesca, architetto toscano del Romanticismo (Pisa, 1777-1852)
 Melis, A., & Melis, G. L. (2002). La Piazza del Duomo di Pisa. In G. Morolli (Ed.), Alessandro Gherardesca, Architetto Toscano del Romanticismo (Pisa, 1777-1852) Edizioni ETS.
 Melis, A., & Melis, G. L. (1996). Architettura Pisana: dal Granducato Lorenese all'unità d'Italia. Edizioni ETS.

References 

21st-century Italian architects
Italian curators
Academics of the University of Portsmouth
Year of birth missing (living people)
Living people